Mégantic is a provincial electoral district in the Estrie and Chaudière-Appalaches regions of Quebec, Canada. It notably includes the municipalities of Lac-Mégantic, Cookshire-Eaton, East Angus, Ascot Corner, Stoke, Weedon and Disraeli.

It was created for the 1867 election (and an electoral district of that name existed earlier in the Legislative Assembly of the Province of Canada and the Legislative Assembly of Lower Canada). It was abolished before the 1973 election and its territory was mostly divided between Lotbinière and Frontenac; a small part also went to Arthabaska. Despite the name, none of the territory of Mégantic went into the newly created Mégantic-Compton. However, Mégantic-Compton was abolished before the 2012 election and its successor electoral district was the recreated Mégantic, which contains most of the former area Mégantic-Compton, as well as parts of Johnson, Richmond, and Frontenac as they existed prior to the 2012 election.

Members of the Legislative Assembly / National Assembly

Election results

2012 - present

^ Change is from redistributed results. CAQ change is from ADQ.

1867 - 1970

* Result compared to Ralliement national

References

External links
Information
 Elections Quebec

Election results
 Election results (National Assembly)
 Election results (QuébecPolitique) (for 2012–present)
 Election results (QuébecPolitique) (for 1867-1970)

Maps
 2011 map (PDF)
2001–2011 changes to Mégantic-Compton (Flash)
 Electoral map of Estrie region
 Electoral map of Chaudière-Appalaches region
 Quebec electoral map, 2011

Quebec provincial electoral districts